Richard Ivan Queen (August 7, 1951 – August 14, 2002) was born in Washington D.C. and worked for the U.S. State Department as Vice Consul at the U.S. Embassy in Tehran, Iran. On November 4, 1979, he was among the 66 hostages taken by Islamic militants calling themselves the Muslim Student Followers of the Imam's Line, an event commonly known as the Iran hostage crisis.

Time as a hostage and release
Richard Queen began to physically deteriorate fairly early during his confinement. While the hostage takers were aware of his ailment, the doctor they provided repeatedly misdiagnosed his ailment as a "Twisted Spine". As his illness progressed and it became increasingly difficult for Queen to stand or walk, he was finally taken to a local hospital where he was examined by the neurologist Dr Mehryar for a more thorough evaluation. After Mehryar's consultation the hostage takers determined that Queen's illness required they release him. Queen was later diagnosed with multiple sclerosis. He was held hostage for 250 days and released on July 11, 1980. Thirteen hostages had been released on November 20, 1979 (after 16 days). The remaining 52 hostages were released on January 20, 1981 (after 444 days).

Richard Queen died on August 14, 2002, in Falls Church, Virginia, due to complications from multiple sclerosis.

He was a graduate of Edgemont High School, class of 1969 and Hamilton College, class of 1973.

See also
List of kidnappings
List of solved missing person cases

External links
"Ex-Hostage Richard Queen Says He's Feeling Better, Thank You – but Hold the Lobster", People, August 18, 1980
"Appreciation: Richard I. Queen, 1951-2002", Foreign Service Journal, October 2002, an obituary of Queen in five parts, by Ambassador Bruce Laingen (fellow hostage), Richard Morefield (foreign service officer and fellow hostage), John Limbert (Ambassador to Mauritania and fellow hostage), Ambassador Ruth A. Davis (Director General of the Foreign Service) and Colin L. Powell (U.S. Secretary of State).
"A Hostage Comes Home", Time, July 28, 1980.

New York Times, By Paul Lewis, Published: August 21, 2002

1951 births
1970s missing person cases
2002 deaths
American expatriates in Iran
American diplomats
American people taken hostage
Deaths from multiple sclerosis
Edgemont Junior – Senior High School alumni
Formerly missing people
Hamilton College (New York) alumni
Iran hostage crisis
Missing person cases in Iran
Neurological disease deaths in Virginia